Zarar Ahmad Moqbel Osmani  (born 1964) is a politician in the Islamic Republic of Afghanistan who served as Minister of Foreign Affairs from 2013 to 2015 and Minister of Interior from 30 September 2005 to 11 October 2008. He previously served as Minister of Counter Narcotics and as Governor of Parwan Province. Prior to this he served as Chief of Police of Parwan province and as First Secretary to Afghan Embassy in Tehran. He also joined the mujahideen during the Soviet–Afghan War, fighting against the Afghan government led by Mohammad Najibullah.

Early years and education
Osmani was born in 1964 in Khuwaja Sayaran village, Parwan Province, Afghanistan. His father was a parliamentarian during King Zahir Shah's administration. He completed his primary education at Sayed Jamaluddin Afghani School in Kabul and his secondary education at Mohammad Osman Khan-e-Parwani Vocational School. He graduated from Habibia High School and later enrolled in the Polytechnical University of Kabul. He studied in Kabul Polytechnic institute from 1983 to 1988. He obtained his BA from the Parwan Pedagogy Institute specializing in math and physics.

Careers
In 1988, Osmani joined the mujahideen in Parwan. However, after the collapse of Najibullah's government in 1992, Osmani was made the Deputy Chief of Staff at the Ministry of National Defense under new the Islamic State of Afghanistan.

By April 1994, Osmani was serving as Chief of Police of Parwan province. Between 1998 and 2002, he served as First Secretary at Afghan Embassy in Tehran. It is said that he was instrumental in helping unite the Northern Alliance. After the collapse of the Taliban regime and establishment of the Karzai administration, Osamani became Governor of Parwan Province in February 2004.

In 2009, Osmani was appointed Minister of Counter Narcotics. During his confirmation, he received the highest ever number of confidence votes from the Afghan Parliament.

On 28 October 2013, President Karzai appointed Osmani as the acting Foreign Minister.

References

External links

Government ministers of Afghanistan
1964 births
Living people
Afghan police officers
Afghan diplomats
Foreign ministers of Afghanistan
Interior ministers of Afghanistan
Kabul Polytechnic University alumni
People from Parwan Province
2000s in Afghanistan
2010s in Afghanistan
21st-century Afghan politicians